Waddamana Hydro-Electric power station (originally known as the Great Lake Scheme) was the first hydro-electric power plant ever operated by the Tasmanian Hydro-Electric Department (later the Hydro-Electric Commission or HEC), opened in 1916.

Waddamana Hydro-Electric Power Station

The privately owned Tasmanian Hydro-Electric Power and Metallurgical Co. Ltd. (HEPMCo) first took a serious interest in generating hydro-electric power from one of Tasmania's highland rivers in late 1909, to provide power for James Hyndes Gillies' newly patented electrolytic process for zinc refining, and a "carbide" smelter to be constructed near Snug. They resolved to construct a hydro-electric power plant in the valley of the Ouse River, above the town that bears that name. Water was to be provided by a small dam on the great lake at Miena, which would then divert water down the steep drop using a woodstave pipeline and a flume. Construction began in earnest in 1910.

However, the Tasmanian Hydro-Electric Power and Metallurgical Co. ran out of money before the scheme could be completed, and they sold the incomplete works to the newly formed Hydro-Electric Department in 1914. The works were completed under Hydro-Electric Department ownership in 1915, and the plant was officially opened in 1916. It was the first plant ever operated by them.

After 1922, 6 x 8,000HP (5.96MW) turbines were installed to meet increased demand.

Waddamana B
In 1931, the Hydro-Electric Commission decided to construct a completely new plant to replace the original Waddamana power station (to be known as (Waddamana A). However, a lack of funds forced them to build it alongside the existing plant instead. Between 1939 and 1949, construction took place for Waddamana B, and until 1965, two power plants were in operation at Waddamana. The new plant was referred to as Waddamana B, and it generated  of electricity from four turbines.

Operation and shutdown
Both Waddamana plants operated through the 1940s and 1950s, but, in the early 1960s, construction of a new, larger power plant at Poatina began. In order for the Poatina plant to be successful, it was necessary to stop the flow of water through Waddamana A and Shannon, both of which were decommissioned (Shannon in 1964, Waddamana A in 1965). The Shannon plant was demolished, but the two Waddamana plants remained standing. Waddamana B remained in active service until 1995 when it too was closed. Waddamana A now has a new life as a museum filled with original equipment and other displays, including the Control room switchboard from the Shannon Power Station.

Engineering heritage award 
Waddamana 'A' station is listed as a National Engineering Landmark by Engineers Australia as part of its Engineering Heritage Recognition Program.

See also

References

External links
 Waddamana Power Station Museum - Hydro Tasmania

History of Tasmania
Central Highlands (Tasmania)
Museums in Tasmania
Technology museums in Australia
Recipients of Engineers Australia engineering heritage markers